Paul O'Connell (born 23 October 1979) is an Irish racing driver and three-time winner of the Irish Hillclimb and Sprint Championship. He has also won the Irish Formulaboss Championship at his first attempt in 2018 and again in 2019. He hold 2 outright Lap records at Mondello Park (National Reverse) and Bishopscourt Co Down.

Career
O'Connell started competing in motorsport in go-karts in 1994 with his friend Denis Hogan.
After a few races in an old kart, he sold it and later purchased his own saloon car. He bought a scrapped 1990 Honda Civic 1.6 si and converted it into a hillclimb car in 1999 in order to compete on the Irish Hillclimb circuit.
His first event was the Limerick Hillclimb in Newcastlewest, run by Limerick Motor Club, in which he drove an Historic Hillman Avenger Tiger with Denis Hogan Jnr. He won best Novice on his first day and 3rd in class on the next.
He competed in the non-championship Lyre Hillclimb run by the Killarney and District Motor club at the end of the year and met Senan O'Connor and Simon McKinley whom he would go on to compete against during the next ten years.

2002
After selling his Honda Civic Hillclimb car he bought a Delta t79 single seater. This single seater had been competing in Ireland since 1980, on racing tracks and in hillclimbs, and had been lying idle for a number of years following the death of its owner.
Powered by a 2.0 litre Ford SOHC engine, in it he learned how to drive single seaters at Irish Hillclimb venues. At his first outing in the car at the Carlow Car Club sprint in Tynagh, he won the event outright. Despite still being in college and working, he managed to compete in the national championship every year even though he had very limited funds.

2006
Having fitted a Connaught Competition Engines 2.3 litre Ford SOHC engine he won his first ever Championship round in Muine Bheag and again the following week in Clare at the Scalp Hillclimb. He finished 3rd overall in the National Championship.

2007
Paul O'Connell debuted a much changed Delta Single seater with a Connaught Competition Engines 2.3 litre Warrior engine fitted to the Delta. Sporting some ex-Williams F1 front and rear wings and using wider magnesium wheels this transformed the Delta into a competitive car to challenge for the National title against drivers such as Frank Burns, Simon McKinley and Sylvie Mullins. Following a good start to the year in which he won or was second in the first eight rounds, he suffered an engine failure in Carlow. He borrowed an older tired 2 litre engine from John Naylor and won the championship for the first time, ahead of Frank Burns and Simon McKinley, despite not winning any more rounds.

2008
Driving his "Delta Warrior", he won the Irish Championship again in 2008. He dominated events during the first half of the season but later, a series of electrical problems led to restricted running and he did not finish in Tipperary. His car suffered a rear suspension failure on the first day of the MEC but, following some hasty repair work, he won in Donegal on the Knockalla Hillclimb ahead of Simon McKinley and Seamus Morris.

2009
2009 saw a tussle all year between Paul O'Connell and Simon McKinley. Still driving the old Delta, Paul O'Connell put up a stiff fight to McKinley who chose between the Lant Rt1, the Warrior Escort a Radical sr3 and even a Lola f3000 Judd during the year.
Again a good start to the season put O'Connell in the lead winning in Wexford and scoring maximum points in Galway. A double win in Carlow meant he could sit out the MEC event and rely on Donegal to score well. 4th place up against the most powerful cars in the country on day 1 put pressure on for day 2 which was run in wet conditions and reduced the power advantage of the faster cars allowing O'Connell to win on day 2 ahead of Simon McKinley.

2010
In 2010, he disposed of his 31-year-old Delta and bought a 2.8 litre Pilbeam MP58 Hart. The first time he drove this car was up to the start line on the first weekend in Galway where he finished second on both days behind McKinley in the Lant. They both broke the record at Ballyalaban on Sunday bringing it down to 95.00 seconds for 2.2 miles. O'Connell finish a hundredth of a second behind on 95.01 in his new Pilbeam.
The car but had to be adapted to Irish Hillclimb conditions during the year. Restricted running due to the Engine mileage put more pressure on but O'Connell finished second consistently pushing McKinley, and well ahead of the rest of the field.
A solitary win in Wexford and the fact that McKinley did not finish put O'Connell ahead coming into the final round. A rear brake disc failure crossing the finish line in practice in Knockalla pitched the Pilbeam into a roll at 102 mph and took all four wheels off the car. O'Connell was uninjured except for a sore neck and bruised ribs. He continued in his Delta for the day but it was no longer competitive against the new generation of faster cars and McKinley won his first Championship title.

2011
With the Pilbeam still being repaired and faced with tough financial times O'Connell did not take part in the 2011 season. He brought out the Delta in Wexford to support the new reduced entry fees and put all efforts into rebuilding the Pilbeam for the 2012 season.
The Pilbeam rebuild was completed immediately before the Irish Festival of Speed held in Adare Manor in Limerick. He had not driven the car since the Donegal crash a year previous but still managed to finish 3rd overall.

He married his fiancée in November 2011.

2012-2017

He competed in selected Hillclimb events in Ireland and in Europe in a variety of cars from the Delta Ff2000, a BMW E30 with a V10 Engine to a Norma M20b sportscar.

2018

Having sold the other cars he bought a Dallara F302 Opel and decided to take on a new challenge of Circuit Racing in the Formulaboss Ireland Championship. He won this championship on his first attempt after a season long battle with ex Hillclimb driver Sylvie Mullins.

He also competed in the FIA hillclimb masters in Gubbio Italy finishing 33rd overall driving the 2.0 litre F3 car and fastest Irish driver.

2019

having sold the F302, he bought a Dallara World Series V6 in which he won the Formulaboss Ireland Championship again winning 11 of the 13 races and setting two Irish lap records.

He also made Irish history by becoming the first Irish Driver to compete and finish on the podium at FIA European Hillclimb championship level. He finished 3rd in the 2.0 litre single seater class in St Ursanne Switzerland at his first attempt.

References

1979 births
Living people
Irish racing drivers